Jaime Joel Droguett Diocares (born 28 August 1988) is a Chilean former football forward who played for clubs in Chile and Mexico.

Career
A forward from Universidad de Chile youth system, Droguett moved to Mexican side Tecos A at the end of 2007, when his brother, Hugo, was a player of Tecos. 

Next, he played for several clubs in his homeland such as Provincial Osorno, Iberia, Unión Temuco, Unión San Felipe, Coquimbo Unido (loan), among others.

Personal life
He is the younger brother of the former Chile international footballer Hugo Droguett.

He started a football academy called Escuela de Fútbol J.J.D.D..

References

External links 
 
 
 Jaime Droguett at TodoPorElFutbol.com 

1982 births
Living people
Chilean people of French descent
Footballers from Santiago
Chilean footballers
Chilean expatriate footballers
Tecos F.C. footballers
Provincial Osorno footballers
Deportes Iberia footballers
Unión Temuco footballers
Trasandino footballers
San Antonio Unido footballers
Unión San Felipe footballers
Coquimbo Unido footballers
Puerto Montt footballers
Ascenso MX players
Primera B de Chile players
Tercera División de Chile players
Segunda División Profesional de Chile players
Expatriate footballers in Mexico
Chilean expatriate sportspeople in Mexico
Association football forwards